The Sextet is a live album by the jazz saxophonist Cannonball Adderley recorded in 1962-63 but not released by the Milestone label until 1982 and featuring performances by Adderley with Nat Adderley, Yusef Lateef, Joe Zawinul, Sam Jones and Louis Hayes recorded in San Francisco and Japan. The album features previously unreleased performances from the Jazz Workshop residency that produced Jazz Workshop Revisited and from the Japanese concerts that produced Nippon Soul.

Reception

The Allmusic review by Scott Yanow says, "Because most of this material had been recorded just a couple years earlier, these versions of such songs as "This Here," "Bohemia After Dark" and "New Delhi" were unissued until the 1980s. The music remains quite exciting and fresh for, although somewhat overshadowed at the time, this was one of the great jazz groups of the 1960s".

Track listing
 "This Here" (Bobby Timmons) – 11:27
 "Never Say Yes" (Nat Adderley) – 8:41
 "Peter and the Goats" (Yusef Lateef) – 6:45
 "New Delhi" (Victor Feldman) – 9:37
 "Bohemia After Dark" (Oscar Pettiford) – 4:49  
Recorded on September 21, 1962 at the Jazz Workshop, San Francisco, CA (tracks 2-4) on July 9, 1963 at Koseinenkin Kaikan, Tokyo, Japan (track 1) and on July 14 at Sankei Hall, Tokyo, Japan (track 5)

Personnel
Cannonball Adderley – alto saxophone
Nat Adderley – cornet
Yusef Lateef – tenor saxophone, flute
Joe Zawinul – piano
Sam Jones – bass
Louis Hayes – drums

References

1982 live albums
Cannonball Adderley live albums
Milestone Records live albums
Albums produced by Orrin Keepnews